"The Sound of Violence" is a song by French electro duo Cassius from the album Au Rêve. It is their only single to reach number one in the United States dance charts. Vocals were provided by Steve Edwards.

Track listings

12"

CD

 Original radio edit
 Narcotic Thrust's Two Minute Warning club mix
 Cosmo Vitelli remix
 David Guetta & Joachim Garraud Dancefloor Killa remix

2011 version 
From Discogs
 The Sound Of Violence (2011 remastered version) – 7:12
 The Sound Of Violence (Cassius Rawkers 2011 remix) – 8:24
 The Sound Of Violence (Franco Cinelli Remix) – 9:20
 The Sound Of Violence (Luciano remix) – 8:22
 The Sound Of Violence (Aeroplane remix) – 7:02
 The Sound Of Violence (Tha Trickaz remix) – 5:10

Music video
The music video is particularly noteworthy for its use of stop animation. The film was produced with heavy use of digital editing techniques and CGI. Some of these examples include rotoscoped patterns in the grass and the continuity of the sky and clouds between the frames. At many points CGI is used to enhance the landscape to a fantasy-like level, and by the end of the film the landscape is completely replaced by abstract blobs and cubes.

Charts

Weekly charts

Year-end charts

References

External links
 Discogs.com entry for Cassius

2002 singles
Cassius (band) songs
2002 songs
Virgin Records singles
Songs written by Steve Edwards (singer)